The featherweight competition at the 2019 AIBA Women's World Boxing Championships was held from 3 to 13 October 2019.

Schedule
The schedule was as follows:

All times are Irkutsk Time (UTC+8)

Results

Finals

Top half

Section 1
Round of 64

Section 2
Round of 64

Bottom half

Section 3
Round of 64

Section 4
Round of 64

References

External links
Draw

Featherweight